Petalostelma is a genus of flowering plants in the family Apocynaceae, first described as a genus in 1885. They are native to South America.

Species

References

Apocynaceae genera
Asclepiadoideae